Trichlorosilane is an inorganic compound with the formula HCl3Si.  It is a colourless, volatile liquid.  Purified trichlorosilane is the principal precursor to ultrapure silicon in the semiconductor industry.  In water, it rapidly decomposes to produce a siloxane polymer while giving off hydrochloric acid.  Because of its reactivity and wide availability, it is frequently used in the synthesis of silicon-containing organic compounds.

Production 
Trichlorosilane is produced by treating powdered metallurgical grade silicon with blowing hydrogen chloride at 300 °C.  Hydrogen is also produced, as described in the chemical equation:
Si + 3 HCl → HCl3Si + H2

Yields of 80-90% can be achieved. The main byproducts are silicon tetrachloride (chemical formula SiCl4), hexachlorodisilane (Si2Cl6) and dichlorosilane (H2SiCl2), from which trichlorosilane can be separated by distillation.

It is also produced from silicon tetrachloride:
Si + 3 SiCl4 + 2 H2 → 4 HCl3Si

Applications 
Trichlorosilane is the basic ingredient used in the production of purified polysilicon.
HCl3Si → Si + HCl + Cl2

Ingredient in hydrosilylation
Via hydrosilylation, trichlorosilane is a precursor to other useful organosilicon compounds:
RCH=CH2 + HSiCl3 → RCH2CH2SiCl3
Some useful products of this or similar reactions include octadecyltrichlorosilane (OTS), perfluoroctyltrichlorosilane (PFOTCS), and perfluorodecyltrichlorosilane (FDTS). These reagents used in surface science and nanotechnology to form Self-assembled monolayers. Such layers containing fluorine decrease surface energy and reduce sticking. This effect is usually exploited as coating for MEMS and microfabricated stamps for a nanoimprint lithography (NIL) and in injection molding tools.

Organic synthesis
Trichlorosilane is a reagent in the conversion of benzoic acids to toluene derivatives. In the first step of a two-pot reaction, the carboxylic acid is first converted to the trichlosilylbenzyl compound.  In the second step, the benzylic silyl derivative is converted to the toluene derivative with base.

Safety 
It reacts violently with water (H2O) producing SiO2, chlorine (Cl) gas, hydrogen chloride (HCl) and heat. According to a safety datasheet, spills of trichlorosilane may be neutralized by using NaOH or NaHCO3, per one or two part of trichlorosilane.

References

 Semiconductors: Silicon: Substrate Manufacture: Polycrystalline silicon Production

Chlorosilanes